5K or 5-K may refer to:

 5K resolution, a display resolution with horizontal resolution on the order of 5,000 pixels
 Gnome-Rhône 5K, a radial aircraft engine
 5000 metres, a long-distance running event in track and field
 5K run, a long-distance road running competition
 Hi Fly (airline) (IATA airline designator)
 Five Ks in Sikhism, five items that Khalsa Sikhs are commanded to wear at all times
 Sander Kleinenberg Presents 5K, 2010 album by Dutch DJ Sander Kleinenberg
 Nightmare of Eden (production code: 5K), a 1979 Doctor Who serial

See also
 K5 (disambiguation)